Fourth-seeded Virginia Ruzici was the defending champion but went out in the semifinals to Andrea Temesvári.
Top-seed Temesvári won the final and $34,000 first prize money by defeating Zina Garrison in the final.

Seeds
The top eight seeds received a bye into the second round. A champion seed is indicated in bold text while text in italics indicates the round in which that seed was eliminated.

  Andrea Temesvári (champion)
  Kathy Rinaldi (semifinals)
  Zina Garrison (final)
  Virginia Ruzici (semifinals)
  Bonnie Gadusek (quarterfinals)
  Helena Suková (second round)
  Carling Bassett (third round)
  Kathy Horvath (quarterfinals)
  Michelle Torres (first round)
  Iva Budařová (third round)
  Mima Jaušovec (third round)
  Ivanna Madruga-Osses (quarterfinals)
  Beth Herr (third round)
  Manuela Maleeva (quarterfinals)

Draw

Finals

Top half

Section 1

Section 2

Bottom half

Section 3

Section 4

References

External links

1983 Virginia Slims World Championship Series
Women's Singles